Elections to the City of Edinburgh District Council took place in May 1992, alongside elections to the councils of Scotland's various other districts.

Labour, which had won control of the Council for the first time ever in the 1984 election, lost overall control but managed to remain the largest party on the council despite losing the popular vote amid a swing to the Conservatives in the city. The Liberal Democrats were able to capture several new seats in the centre of the city, including Marchmont, Morningside, and Sciennes. Voter turnout was 48.2%, down 5% from the previous elections.

Aggregate results

References

1992
1992 Scottish local elections
1990s in Edinburgh